The Grand Canyon Skywalk is a horseshoe-shaped cantilever bridge with a glass walkway at Eagle Point in Arizona near the Colorado River on the edge of a side canyon in the Grand Canyon West area of the main canyon. In 2015 the attraction passed one million visitors.

Commissioned and owned by the Hualapai Indian tribe, the skywalk was unveiled March 20, 2007, and opened to the general public on March 28, 2007. It is immediately north of Grand Canyon West Airport and about 120 miles (190km) east of Las Vegas, NV. The skywalk is east of Meadview, AZ. Kingman, AZ is the closest city with more than 10,000 population.

Design and construction

David Jin, an entrepreneur who had been involved with tourism and the Hualapai Nation for some time, had the idea of extending a platform out over the edge of the Grand Canyon. With the help of architect Mark Ross Johnson, that idea evolved into a rectangular walkway and eventually the "U"-shaped walkway constructed.

The outer and inner  by  bridge box beams are supported by eight  box posts having four posts on each side of the visitor's center, once completed.

The deck of the Skywalk has been made with four layers of Saint-Gobain Diamant low iron glass with DuPont SentryGlas interlayer. The Skywalk glass sidings were made with the same glass as the deck, but fewer layers (two) bent to follow the walkway's curvature.

The Skywalk deck was designed for a 100-pound-per-square-foot (490 kg/m2) live load along with code-required seismic and wind forces.  The foundation can withstand an 8.0 magnitude earthquake within .  Fine-tuning of the project occurred after a wind loading and pedestrian induced vibration analysis. Two tuned mass dampers were installed inside the outer box beam as well as one inside the inner box beam at the furthest extension of the Skywalk to reduce pedestrian footfall vibration. The walkway could carry 822 people that weigh  each without overstress, but maximum occupancy at one time is 120 people.

The Skywalk was assembled on top of the canyon wall in line with its final placement and moved into final position by a jack and roll rig. The Skywalk infrastructure itself weighs a little over  without counterweights but including the tuned mass dampers, railing hardware, glass rails, glass deck and steel box beams. At the time of roll-out, the Skywalk weighed approximately 1.6 million pounds (730,000 kg). The process was completed in two days.

Astronauts Buzz Aldrin and John Herrington attended the opening ceremony on March 20, 2007.

A National Geographic documentary film on the construction of the Skywalk has been published.

Cornerstone of a larger plan

According to Hualapai officials, the cost of the Skywalk was $30 million. Plans for the Grand Canyon Skywalk complex include a museum, movie theater, VIP lounge, gift shop, and several restaurants including a high-end restaurant called The Skywalk Café where visitors will be able to dine outdoors at the canyon's rim. The Skywalk is the cornerstone of a larger plan by the Hualapai tribe, which it hopes will be the catalyst for a  development to be called Grand Canyon West; it would open up a  stretch along the canyon's South Rim and include hotels, restaurants, a golf course, casinos, and a cable car to ferry visitors from the canyon rim to the Colorado River, which has been previously inaccessible.

Controversy

Hualapai
Opponents within the tribe view the project as disturbing sacred ground. Supporters within the tribe counter that it is an opportunity to generate much-needed cash to combat serious problems that plague the small 2,000-resident reservation, including a 50% unemployment rate, widespread alcoholism, and poverty. Other tribal members are happy with the Skywalk, but they have expressed concern over future development. They are also concerned about the potential lack of sustainability because the water used in the development is not taken from the Colorado River but trucked in from elsewhere.
Effective February 7, 2012 certain members of the Hualapai Tribal Council, without prior notice, seized control of the Skywalk which was built and previously run by Grand Canyon Skywalk Development (GCSD), a Las Vegas, Nevada corporation. Currently Grand Canyon Skywalk Development is not in charge of daily operations at the Skywalk. GCSD was awarded 28 million dollars in damages by an arbitration board, which was upheld in U.S. District Court in February 2013.

Environmentalists
People outside of the tribe, including Arizona environmental groups and former National Park officials, have expressed concern about the project's obtrusiveness in the natural environment, considering it a defacement of a national treasure. Former Grand Canyon National Park Superintendent Robert Arnberger has described the development as "the equivalent of an upscale carnival ride," adding that he has been unable to resolve "the apparent conflict between the tribe's oft-stated claim that there is no better caregiver and steward of the Grand Canyon than the tribe, and their approach to the land – which is based on heavy use and economics." Tribal leaders counter that the 5 million people a year who visit the National Park portion are already overburdening an area and, further, that the tribe needs financial income. As of 2013, the Skywalk attracted approximately 370,000 visitors per year.

Tourism, access, and protection

Access to the Skywalk can be made from Las Vegas, Nevada in the north or Kingman, Arizona in the south, via Highway 93. The routes converge (at CR 7/Buck and Doe Rd) near Diamond Bar Road.

There are several packages available for purchase at the airport terminal visitor center. Every package includes parking at the terminal and shuttle bus transportation to the two scenic viewing areas and the Hualapai Ranch. As of 2015, the final  of county-maintained road to the attraction has been paved  and is now accessible to everyone. In addition to admission, visitors may purchase professional photographs of their visit to the Skywalk in the gift shop, as personal cameras are not allowed on the Skywalk itself. Along with other personal property, they must be stored in a locker before entering the Skywalk.
Besides the Skywalk, the Eagle Point offers other activities, i.e., Native American dances in the amphitheater, Native American gift shop, and Native American Village with dwellings of the indigenous tribes of the region, such as Hualapai, Plains, Hopi, Navajo, and Havasupai. There are buses connecting all the points within the Grand Canyon West area.

References

External links 

 

Bridges in Arizona
Pedestrian bridges in the United States
Grand Canyon
Hualapai
Glass architecture
Bridges completed in 2007
Buildings and structures in Coconino County, Arizona
Transportation in Coconino County, Arizona
Tourist attractions in Coconino County, Arizona
Observation decks
Cantilever bridges in the United States
Glass-bottomed bridges
2007 establishments in Arizona
Grand Canyon, South Rim
Grand Canyon, South Rim (west)
Scenic viewpoints in the United States